Ian Seidenfeld (born July 17, 2001) is an American para table tennis player. He represented the United States at the 2020 Summer Paralympics.

Career
Seidenfeld represented the United States at the 2020 Summer Paralympics in the men's table tennis singles C6 event and won a gold medal.

Personal life
His father, Mitchell Seidenfeld, is a former Para table tennis player and gold medalist.

References

External links
 
 

2001 births
Living people
Sportspeople from Minnesota
People from Lakeville, Minnesota
Paralympic table tennis players of the United States
Table tennis players at the 2020 Summer Paralympics
Medalists at the 2020 Summer Paralympics
Paralympic medalists in table tennis
Paralympic gold medalists for the United States
Medalists at the 2019 Parapan American Games
American male table tennis players